Dmitry Ovechko (born 4 February 1971) is a Russian rower. He competed in the men's lightweight double sculls event at the 2000 Summer Olympics.

References

External links
 

1971 births
Living people
Russian male rowers
Olympic rowers of Russia
Rowers at the 2000 Summer Olympics
Sportspeople from Chelyabinsk